General La Madrid is a partido in the central region of Buenos Aires Province in Argentina.

The Partido and its capital city are named after General Gregorio Aráoz de Lamadrid, a general who fought in the Argentine War of Independence. He served with Argentine heroes such as José de San Martín, Manuel Belgrano and José María Paz.

Towns
 General La Madrid
 La Colina
 Líbano
 Las Martinetas
 Pontaut

1890 establishments in Argentina
Partidos of Buenos Aires Province